A Norwegian Dakotan is a Norwegian American (a person with Norwegian ancestry) in the U. S. states of North and South Dakota. One in three of all North Dakotans is of Norwegian heritage, which is the highest among all U.S. states. South Dakota is number three, behind Minnesota. The immigrants settled primarily between 1870 and 1920.

As of 2009, 312,697 Dakotans claim Norwegian ancestry, 21.4% of the region's population (30.8% of North Dakota's population and 14.0% of South Dakota's population), or 6.7% of the total Norwegian American population.

History

Settlements 

The first Norwegians arrived in the Dakotas as early as 1859, shortly after the treaty with the Yankton Sioux was signed July 10, 1859. It took another ten years before the greater influx of Norwegians took place.

North Dakota 
Mike Jacobs of the Grand Forks Herald observed that two Governors of North Dakota (Ragnvald Nestos and John Moses) "were born in Norway, almost as good politically as being a native North Dakotan". Norwegian immigrants began arriving in North Dakota in the 1870s. They settled mainly in the eastern and northern parts of the state, but today they live most everywhere in the state. Because of the lack of farmland in Norway, the Norwegian immigrants sought the wonderful fertile farmland of North Dakota. Some of the immigrants had spent a few years in other states before they finally arrived in North Dakota. In 1880 the census recorded 8,814 Norwegians in North Dakota, and by 1900 there were 73,744.

The towns of Columbus and Larson are approximately 100% Norwegian, founded by Columbus Larsson in 1906 and 1907. Columbus had 672 inhabitants in 1960, while it has just 133 in 2010. Although these towns have a strong Norwegian heritage, none of the inhabitants speak Norwegian. Like the trend for the rest of North Dakotans, Norwegians are moving out of the rural areas. 

There are several examples of Norwegian ghost towns in North Dakota, especially in the northwestern part of the state.

Settlers from Telemark 

Telemark settlers found their way to most of the major settlements in North Dakota in the late 1870s and early 1880s. In 1880, a band of people from Telemark, settled in the area of what is now Bue (named for the settlers' Norwegian home in Bø, Telemark) in Nelson County. Their main cash crop was wheat, and they soon found that raising cattle was also quite lucrative. The main markets were in Valley City and Grand Forks.

Sondre Norheim, Father of Modern Skiing, emigrated to North Dakota. On May 30, 1884 Sondre and Rannei left Norway together with three of their  children–  Anne (21), Åmund (14) and Talleiv (12). Their son Olav and daughter Hæge had left home previously, and their eldest daughter Ingerid, decided to stay back home. Norheim followed in the footsteps of many of his neighbors in Morgedal and immigrated to the United States. After having first settled in Minnesota, they moved to North Dakota, near Villard in McHenry County. He continued to ski when he could, though the climate and flat topography of the Dakota prairie offered few opportunities for downhill skiing. It was said he always had a pair of skis placed outside his door. Norheim grew more religious with age and helped build a Lutheran church in Villard. He died in 1897 and was buried in Denbigh, McHenry County, North Dakota.

South Dakota 

According to the 1860 Census there were 129 Norwegians in South Dakota. That changed fast; in 1880 one-tenth of the population was Norwegian, and in 1889 one-third of the population were Norwegians. The towns of Roslyn and Pierpont were originally almost 100 percent Norwegian, but these are very small cities.  South Dakota has had a number of Governors of Norwegian ancestry but the state's third governor,  Niels Boe was born in Bergen, Norway in 1847 and came to Dakota with his parents as a young man.   South Dakota's 19th  governor, Sigurd Anderson was born at Frolands Verk near Arendal, Norway in 1904.  He came to America several years later settling with his parents in Lincoln County, SD which has a large Norwegian population.   Canton, SD was the original home of the Norwegian Lutheran, Augustana College which is today Augustana University located in Sioux Falls.

Influence 

The immigrants from Norway (and the rest of Scandinavia) in the Dakotas have played an extremely important role in the development of the region. Few places in the United States have been so influenced by one ethnic group, and because Norwegians is a relatively small ethnic group, it makes it even more clear.

Cuisine 

Those who emigrated brought their food traditions, too. The Dakotas are, together with Minnesota, famous for their typical Scandinavian cuisine. Lefse, Krumkake, Lutefisk, and Raspeball/Komle/Klubb (called Potato Dumplings in the United States) is just some of the food traditions there, not only eaten by Norwegian American, but other people in the state. 

Churches throughout the state commonly host annual fellowship dinners open to the community.  Perhaps one of the largest authentic Norwegian dinners is the annual Lutefisk Dinner hosted by the First Lutheran Church, Williston, North Dakota, every February.

The largest Scandinavian Festival in North America is the annual Norsk Høstfest held every October, in Minot, North Dakota.  This five-day cultural event features Scandinavian dishes, but does accommodate those who are not fond of lutefisk by providing German entrees.

Language 

All of the Norwegians who came to the Dakotas spoke Norwegian, and the number of speakers grew with the immigration. Most of them learned English, or at least their children did. There were several Norwegian-language newspapers in the United States. But when the largest waves of immigration ended, in the 1920s, the number of Norwegian speakers decreased. That was because the second and third generation immigrants didn't learn Norwegian as a primary language, and it wasn't necessary because everyone spoke English.  

However, some Norwegian words and phrases survived, but are no longer pronounced with a Norwegian accent, such as Uff da. As of 2005, 1,743 speak Norwegian as their primary language in North Dakota, which is only 0.2% of the population, and 1,097 are older than 65 years old. In South Dakota, 256 people speak Norwegian, and all of them are older than 65 years. These numbers are just for those who speak Norwegian as their primary language. The number who understand basic Norwegian is higher.

This is a list of Dakotan communities with the highest percentage of Norwegian speakers:

 Northwood, North Dakota 4.41% (39 persons)
 Mayville, North Dakota 3.56% (65 persons)
 Crosby, North Dakota 2.81% (30 persons)
 Velva, North Dakota 2.51% (24 persons)
 Cooperstown, North Dakota 2.21% (23 persons)
 Tioga, North Dakota 1.42% (15 persons)
 Bottineau, North Dakota 1.35% (30 persons)
 Lakota, North Dakota 1.33% (10 persons)
 Stanley, North Dakota 1.16% (14 persons)
 Williston, North Dakota 1.13% (134 persons)

This is a list of Dakotan counties with the highest percentage of Norwegian speakers:

 Divide County, North Dakota 2.25% (49 persons)
 Traill County, North Dakota 2.08% (165 persons)
 Griggs County, North Dakota 2.02% (53 persons)
 Nelson County, North Dakota 1.98% (70 persons)
 Steele County, North Dakota 1.61% (34 persons)
 Bottineau County, North Dakota 1.24% (85 persons)
 Ransom County, North Dakota 1.18% (65 persons)
 Walsh County, North Dakota 1.14% (133 persons)
 Mountrail County, North Dakota 0.98% (60 persons)
 McHenry County, North Dakota 0.95% (54 persons)

Demographics 

The number of Norwegian Americans is slightly increasing, as the population as a whole, and the percentage of Norwegian Americans in these areas is stable.

North Dakota 

Norwegians in North Dakota are younger than the average population. 13.8% of the population is younger than 18 years old, while the state as a whole is 10.3%.

Of North Dakota's population in the year 2000 at 642,200, 193,158 said that they have Norwegian ancestry, or 30.0%. Of them 95,438 (49.4%) were male, and 97,720 (50.6%) were female. The median age was 35, in contrast to 36 for the whole North Dakotan population, 36.7 for the whole American population, and 39.4 for Norway's population. 

Among Norwegians in North Dakota, 12,850 were younger than the age of 5 (or 6.6% of all those with Norwegian ancestry); of the whole North Dakotan population, 39,094 were younger than the age of 5 (or 6.0% of all North Dakotans). Among Norwegian North Dakotans, 13,890 were between 5 and 17 years of age (or 7.1% of all those with Norwegian ancestry), compared to 27,208 between 5 and 17 for the whole North Dakotan population (or 4.2% of all North Dakotans). Among the group, 141,371 were between 18 and 64 (or 73.1% of all Norwegian North Dakotans), compared to 481,301 between 18 and 64 for the whole North Dakotan population (or 74.9% of all North Dakotans). Among the group, 25,047 were older than 65 (or 12.9% of all those with Norwegian ancestry), compared to 94,597 older than 65 for the whole North Dakotan population (or 14.7% of all North Dakotans). Many people of Norwegian descent, particularly the older ones, still continue some traditions that mark them as related to Norway.

The household population number 188,363, when the group quarters population number 4,795. The average household size is 2, when the average family size is 3. Occupied housing units number 77,176; of them, owner-occupied housing units number 52,425 and renter-occupied housing units number 24,751. 

119,393 are 25 years, or over. Of them, 105,733 are high school graduate or higher, and 30,129 bachelor's degree or higher. 16,391 is civilian veterans (civilian population 18 years and over). 25,329 has disability status (population 5 years and over). 618 are foreign born. 42,265 is male, now married, except separated (population 15 years and over) and 43,213 is female, now married, except separated (population 15 years and over). Approximately 5,422 said they speak a language other than English at home (population 5 years and over).

104,400 are in labor force (population 16 years and over). Mean travel time to work in minutes (workers 16 years and over) is 16. Median household income in 1999 (dollars) were 36,006, while median family income in 1999 (dollars) were 46,170, per capita income in 1999 (dollars) were 18,249. Families below poverty level number 3,233, while individuals below poverty level number 17,570. Single-family owner-occupied homes number 37,688. Of them, median value (dollars) number 75,500, median of selected monthly owner costs is not applicable, with a mortgage (dollars) number 836, while not mortgaged (dollars) number 272.

South Dakota 

Of South Dakota's population in the year 2000 at 754,844, 115,292 said that they have Norwegian ancestry, or 15.2%. Of them 56,361 (48.9%) were male, and 58,931 (51.1%) were female. The median age was 36, exactly the same as for the whole South Dakotan population, slightly lower with 36.7 for the whole American population, and lower with 39.4 for Norway's population.

Among Norwegians in South Dakota, 7,414 were younger than the age of 5 (or 6.4% of all those with Norwegian ancestry); of the whole South Dakotan population, 51,024 were younger than the age of 5 (or 6.7% of all South Dakotans). Among Norwegian South Dakotans, 8,027 were between 5 and 17 years of age (or 6.9% of all those with Norwegian ancestry), compared to 43,586 between 5 and 17 for the whole South Dakotan population (or 5.7% of all South Dakotans). Among the group, 83,830 were between 18 and 64 (or 72.7% of all Norwegian South Dakotans), compared to 481,301 between 18 and 64 for the whole South Dakotan population (or 73.1% of all South Dakotans). Among the group, 16,021 were older than 65 (or 13.8% of all those with Norwegian ancestry), compared to 108,116 older than 65 for the whole South Dakotan population (or 14.3% of all South Dakotans).

The household population number 112,480, when the group quarters population number 2,812. The average household size is 2, when the average family size is 3. Occupied housing units number 45,206; of them, owner-occupied housing units number 32,728 and renter-occupied housing units number 12,478. 

71,963 are 25 years, or over. Of them, 64,874 are high school graduate or higher, and 18,155 bachelor's degree or higher. 10,926 is civilian veterans (civilian population 18 years and over). 14,749 has disability status (population 5 years and over). 258 are foreign born. 25,815 is male, now married, except separated (population 15 years and over) and 26,488 is female, now married, except separated (population 15 years and over). Approximately 2,562 said they speak a language other than English at home (population 5 years and over).

63,710 are in labor force (population 16 years and over). Mean travel time to work in minutes (workers 17 years and over) is 16. Median household income in 1999 (dollars) were 38,934, while median family income in 1999 (dollars) were 47,700, per capita income in 1999 (dollars) were 19,025. Families below poverty level number 1,584, while individuals below poverty level number 8,394. Single-family owner-occupied homes number 23,074. Of them, median value (dollars) number 83,000, median of selected monthly owner costs is not applicable, with a mortgage (dollars) number 838, while not mortgaged (dollars) number 285.

Norwegian communities in the Dakotas 

The 25 Dakotan communities with the highest percentage of residents claiming Norwegian ancestry are (Those in bold are the largest in the state):

 Northwood, North Dakota 55.5%
 Crosby, North Dakota 52.3%
 Mayville, North Dakota 48.5%
 Cooperstown, North Dakota 46.6%
 Tioga, North Dakota 45.7%
 Stanley, North Dakota 42.4%
 Lakota, North Dakota 39.2%
 Velva, North Dakota 38.1%
 Williston, North Dakota 37.6%
 Hillsboro, North Dakota 37.3%
 Park River, North Dakota 37.1%
 Watford City, North Dakota 37.0%
 New Rockford, North Dakota 34.4%
 Williston, North Dakota 34.2%
 Thompson, North Dakota 33.6%
 Reeder, North Dakota 33.3%
 Rugby, North Dakota 33.1%
 Bottineau, North Dakota 32.1%
 Garrison, North Dakota 31.8%
 Horace, North Dakota 31.7%
 Grafton, North Dakota 31.4%
 Stanley, North Dakota 31.2%
 Enderlin, North Dakota 30.8%
 Volga, South Dakota 30.3%
 Lisbon, North Dakota 30.2%

Norwegian counties in the Dakotas 

The 25 Dakotan counties with the highest percentage of residents claiming Norwegian ancestry are (Those in bold are the largest in the state):

 Divide County, North Dakota 64.7%
 Steele County, North Dakota 62.0%
 Traill County, North Dakota 59.0%
 Griggs County, North Dakota 58.9%
 Nelson County, North Dakota 54.8%
 Burke County, North Dakota 53.1%
 Williams County, North Dakota 48.2%
 Eddy County, North Dakota 47.4%
 Bottineau County, North Dakota 46.0%
 Renville County, North Dakota 42.4%
 Barnes County, North Dakota 40.8%
 Walsh County, North Dakota 40.6%
 Ransom County, North Dakota 39.3%
 Pierce County, North Dakota 39.0%
 Ramsey County, North Dakota 37.1%
 Cass County, North Dakota 36.9%
 Mountrail County, North Dakota 36.8%
 Sargent County, North Dakota 36.5%
 McHenry County, North Dakota 35.6%
 Marshall County, South Dakota 35.1%
 Grand Forks County, North Dakota 34.9%
 McKenzie County, North Dakota 34.2%
 Towner County, North Dakota 34.0%
 Bowman County, North Dakota 33.7%
 Foster County, North Dakota 33.4%

Notable people

 Fred G. Aandahl
 LeRoy H. Anderson
 Lynn Anderson
 Sigurd Anderson

 Aslag Benson
 Bertil W. Benson
 Gordon Berg
 Rick Berg
 Kenneth O. Bjork
 Nils Boe
 Harald Bredesen
 Norman Brunsdale
 Olger B. Burtness

 William C. Christianson
 Alf Clausen

 Christian M. Dahl
 Dorthea Dahl
 Math Dahl

 Paul Egertson
 CariDee English
 LeRoy Erickson
 Oscar E. Erickson
 Ralph J. Erickstad
 E. W. Everson

 Paul Fjelde
 Oscar Randolph Fladmark
 Myron Floren
 Hans Andersen Foss
 Joe Foss
 Wilbur Foss
 Michael E. Fossum

 Don Gaetz
 Rudolph Hjalmar Gjelsness
 Clarence Gonstead
 James D. Gronna
 Archie M. Gubbrud

 John Hamre
 Orin D. Haugen
 Brynhild Haugland
 Heidi Heitkamp
 Ralph Herseth
 Clint Hill (Secret Service)
 Johan Andreas Holvik

 Ernest and Clarence Iverson

 Simon Johnson (novelist)
 Tim Johnson (South Dakota politician)
 Carl O. Jorgenson

 Thomas S. Kleppe
 Harvey B. Knudson
 Coya Knutson
 Anton Kraabel
 Ed Kringstad
 Karen Ordahl Kupperman

 Jonny Lang
 Arthur Larson
 Ernest Lawrence
 John H. Lawrence
 Andrew E. Lee
 Peggy Lee
 Neil Levang
 Henry G. Lykken

 George S. Mickelson
 George Theodore Mickelson
 John Moses (American politician)
 Janne Myrdal

 Gerhard Brandt Naeseth
 Ragnvald Nestos
 Kemper Nomland
 Peter Norbeck
 Sondre Norheim
 Hjalmar Carl Nygaard

 Matthew G. Olsen
 Allen I. Olson
 Gunder Olson
 Kenton Onstad
 Carleton Opgaard

 Robert W. Peterson (politician)

 Aagot Raaen
 Scott Rislov
 Erling Nicolai Rolfsrud
 Ole Edvart Rølvaag
 Andrew J. Rommeriam
 Cyrus M. Running

 Martin Olav Sabo
 Stephanie Herseth Sandlin
 Peter O. Sathre
 Gilmore Schjeldahl
 Peter Schjeldahl
 Eric Sevareid
 Thomas Sletteland
 Arlan Stangeland
 Bob Stenehjem
 Wayne Stenehjem

 Obert C. Teigen
 Enoch Thorsgard
 John Thune
 Edward John Thye
 Merle Tuve

 James M. Wahl
 Jon Wefald
 Frank A. Wenstrom

References 

 
 
European American culture in South Dakota
European American culture in North Dakota
Dakotan